R v Reed (Nicholas) [1982] Crim. L.R. 819 is an English criminal law case, dealing with suicide and criminal conspiracy. The court ruled that the event that the defendant conspired about did not have to take place for an offence to have been committed.

Facts
The defendant was arranging suicide pacts, but no one actually committed suicide.

Judgment
The court decided that if anyone had committed suicide, he would have been charged with, among other things, conspiring to aid and abet a suicide, so he should be charged now with the conspiracy.

See also
English criminal law

Notes

R
1982 in England
1982 in case law
1982 in British law